The Sixth Canadian Ministry was the cabinet chaired by Prime Minister Sir Mackenzie Bowell.  It governed Canada from 21 December 1894 to 27 April 1896, including only the last year of the 7th Canadian Parliament.  The government was formed by the old Conservative Party of Canada.

Ministers
Prime Minister 
21 December 1894 – 1 May 1896: Sir Mackenzie Bowell
Minister of Agriculture 
21 December 1894 – 13 July 1895: Auguste-Réal Angers
13 July 1895 – 21 December 1895: Joseph-Aldric Ouimet (acting)
21 December 1895 – 6 January 1896: Walter Humphries Montague
6 January 1896 – 15 January 1896: Donald Ferguson (acting)
15 January 1896 – 1 May 1896: Walter Humphries Montague
Controller of Customs
24 December 1895 – 6 January 1896: John Fisher Wood
6 January 1896 – 15 January 1896: Sir Frank Smith (acting)
 15 January 1896 – 1 May 1896: John Fisher Wood
Minister of Finance
21 December 1894 – 6 January 1896: George Eulas Foster
6 January 1896 – 15 January 1896: Sir Mackenzie Bowell (acting)
15 January 1896 – 27 April 1896: George Eulas Foster
Receiver General of Canada
21 December 1894 – 27 April 1896: The Minister of Finance (Ex officio)
21 December 1894 – 6 January 1896: George Eulas Foster
6 January 1896 – 15 January 1896: Sir Mackenzie Bowell (acting)
15 January 1896 – 1 May 1896: George Eulas Foster
Superintendent-General of Indian Affairs
21 December 1894 – 1 May 1896: The Minister of the Interior (Ex officio)
21 December 1894 – 1 May 1896: Thomas Mayne Daly
Controller of Inland Revenue
 17 December 1895 – 1 May 1896: Edward Gawler Prior
Minister of the Interior
21 December 1894 – 1 May 1896: Thomas Mayne Daly
Minister of Justice 
21 December 1894 – 6 January 1896: Sir Charles Hibbert Tupper
6 January 1896 – 15 January 1896: Thomas Mayne Daly (acting)
15 January 1896 – 1 May 1896: Arthur Rupert Dickey
Attorney General of Canada
21 December 1894 – 27 April 1896: The Minister of Justice (Ex officio)
21 December 1894 – 6 January 1896: Sir Charles Hibbert Tupper
6 January 1896 – 15 January 1896: Thomas Mayne Daly (acting)
15 January 1896 – 1 May 1896: Arthur Rupert Dickey
Leader of the Government in the Senate
21 December 1894 – 1 May 1896: Sir Mackenzie Bowell
Minister of Marine and Fisheries
21 December 1894 – 1 May 1896: John Costigan
Minister of Militia and Defence
21 December 1894 – 26 March 1895: James Colebrooke Patterson
26 March 1895 – 6 January 1896: Arthur Rupert Dickey
6 January 1896 – 15 January 1896: Sir Mackenzie Bowell (acting)
15 January 1896 – 1 May 1896: Alphonse Desjardins
Postmaster General 
21 December 1894 – 1 May 1896: Sir Joseph Philippe René Adolphe Caron
President of the Privy Council
21 December 1894 – 1 May 1896: Sir Mackenzie Bowell
Minister of Public Works 
 21 December 1894 – 1 May 1896: Joseph-Aldric Ouimet
Minister of Railways and Canals
21 December 1894 – 6 January 1896: John Graham Haggart
6 January 1896 – 15 January 1896: Joseph-Aldric Ouimet (acting)
15 January 1896 – 1 May 1896: John Graham Haggart
Secretary of State of Canada
21 December 1894 – 26 March 1895: Arthur Rupert Dickey
26 March 1895 – 21 December 1895: Walter Humphries Montague
21 December 1895 – 6 January 1896: Joseph-Aldric Ouimet (acting)
6 January 1896 – 15 January 1896: Thomas Mayne Daly (acting)
15 January 1896 – 1 May 1896: Sir Charles Hibbert Tupper
Registrar General of Canada
21 December 1894 – 1 May 1896:: The Secretary of State of Canada (Ex officio)
21 December 1894 – 26 March 1895: Arthur Rupert Dickey
26 March 1895 – 21 December 1895: Walter Humphries Montague
21 December 1895 – 6 January 1896: Joseph-Aldric Ouimet (acting)
6 January 1896 – 15 January 1896: Thomas Mayne Daly (acting)
15 January 1896 – 1 May 1896: Sir Charles Hibbert Tupper
Minister of Trade and Commerce
21 December 1894 – 6 January 1896: William Bullock Ives
6 January 1896 – 15 January 1896: John Costigan (acting)
15 January 1896 – 1 May 1896: William Bullock Ives
Minister without Portfolio
21 December 1894 – 26 March 1895: Walter Humphries Montague
21 December 1894 – 1 May 1896: Sir Frank Smith 
2 January 1895 – 1 May 1896: Donald Ferguson
26 March 1895 – 1 September 1895: James Colebrooke Patterson

Offices not of the Cabinet
Controller of Customs
21 December 1894 – 14 December 1895: Nathaniel Clarke Wallace
14 December 1895 – 17 December 1895: John Fisher Wood (acting)
17 December 1895 – 24 December 1895: John Fisher Wood
Controller of Inland Revenue
21 December 1894 – 17 December 1895: John Fisher Wood
Solicitor General of Canada
21 December 1894 – 18 October 1895: John Joseph Curran
18 October 1895 – 1 May 1896: Vacant

References

Succession

06
1894 establishments in Canada
1896 disestablishments in Canada
Cabinets established in 1894
Cabinets disestablished in 1896
Ministries of Queen Victoria